T. Ryan Lane is an American attorney, businessman, and politician serving as a member of the New Mexico House of Representatives from the 3rd district. Elected in 2020, he assumed office on January 19, 2021.

Early life and education 
Born and raised in Aztec, New Mexico, Lane graduated from Aztec High School. After earning his bachelor's degree in mathematics, he earned a Juris Doctor from the Liberty University School of Law.

Career 
After graduating from law school, Lane served as a law clerk for James A. Teilborg. Lane then worked as an associate attorney at a law firm in Farmington, New Mexico before returning to his hometown to establish a private legal practice. Lane ran unopposed in the 2020 Republican primary and November general election. He assumed office on January 19, 2021.

When fellow state legislator Georgene Louis, a Democrat, was arrested for aggravated DWI in February 2022, she called Lane, after the first several of her colleagues whom she called were unavailable.  Lane then drove to the police station as she requested, but was turned away by the arresting officer because Louis was in the booking process.

References 

Living people
People from Aztec, New Mexico
Liberty University School of Law alumni
New Mexico lawyers
Businesspeople from New Mexico
Republican Party members of the New Mexico House of Representatives
People from Farmington, New Mexico
Year of birth missing (living people)